"Beyond" is a three-minute long instrumental song by the band the Moody Blues from their 1969 album To Our Children's Children's Children, a concept album about space travel.  "Beyond" was written by the Moody Blues' drummer Graeme Edge.  It was the Moody Blues' second fully instrumental song on one of their albums.  The first was the song "The Voyage" from their previous album On the Threshold of a Dream.  It was also the first released Moody Blues song written by Edge that did not involve spoken vocals.

In the compilation This Is The Moody Blues, the first portion of this track is dubbed into the background of the poem "The Word", originally from the In Search of the Lost Chord album.

Personnel
 Justin Hayward – electric guitar
 John Lodge – bass guitar
 Mike Pinder – Mellotron
 Ray Thomas – flute
 Graeme Edge – drums, percussion

References 

1969 songs
The Moody Blues songs
Songs written by Graeme Edge